José Fuentes (born 26 May 1960) is a Puerto Rican judoka. He competed in the men's middleweight event at the 1984 Summer Olympics.

References

1960 births
Living people
Puerto Rican male judoka
Olympic judoka of Puerto Rico
Judoka at the 1984 Summer Olympics
Place of birth missing (living people)
Pan American Games medalists in judo
Judoka at the 1983 Pan American Games
Pan American Games bronze medalists for Puerto Rico
21st-century Puerto Rican people
20th-century Puerto Rican people